Claude Champagne (27 May 1891 – 21 December 1965) was a French Canadian composer, teacher, pianist, and violinist.

Early life and education
Born as Joseph-Arthur-Adonaï Claude Champagne in Montreal, Quebec, Champagne began piano and theory at 10 with Orpha-F. Deveaux, and continued with Romain-Octave Pelletier I and Alexis Contant at the Conservatoire national de musique. At 14, he studied violin with Albert Chamberland. He earned diplomas from private institutions: the Dominion College of Music (theory and piano, 1908) and the Conservatoire national of Montreal.

Career

Early career

Between 1910 and 1921 Champagne taught piano, violin, and other instruments at the Varennes and Longueuil colleges. He performed on viola and saxophone with the Canadian Grenadier Guards Band directed by J.-J. Gagnier and gave private lessons in theory and harmony. He accompanied choirs, including that of the Maisonneuve district, and played violin during intermissions at the National, a variety theatre.

In 1921 Champagne went to Paris to study music. By then he had developed an interest in modality, which stayed with him the rest of his life.

Later career

At his return to Canada, Champagne became heavily involved in teaching. HIn 1932 he joined the Faculty of Music at McGill University, where he taught until 1941.

He played an instrumental role in establishing the Conservatoire de musique et d'art dramatique du Québec in 1942. In 1943 he was appointed the first assistant director of the Montreal Conservatoire. In the 1950s, with Boris Berlin, he published a series of sight reading exercise books for students. In 1950 his post-romantic work Concerto was recorded by BMI Canada, and in about 1955 his First String Quartet was performed by the Montreal String Quartet, and recorded by the CBC Transcription Service.

He was attached to the Montreal Catholic School Commission as co-ordinator of solfége in elementary schools, and he was at the same time professor at the McGill Conservatory. After that, he taught many Canadian composers including Jean Vallerand and François Morel.

Death
He died in Montreal on December 21, 1965. A concert hall at the Université de Montréal was later named for him.

Works
Symphonie Gaspésienne
Fantaisie "J'ai du bon tabac" - for orchestra
Hercule et Omphale - for orchestra
La Laurentienne - for orchestra
Danse Villageoise
Piano Concerto (Fiesta)
Suite Canadienne - for choir and orchestra
Berceuse - for small orchestra
Prière - for organ
Quadrilha Brasileira for Piano (1942)
Many choral pieces

Awards and honours
In 1963, Champagne was presented with an award by the Canada Council.

See also

References

External links
 https://web.archive.org/web/20060821190307/http://www.collectionscanada.ca/champagne/index-e.html
 Suite Canadienne at University of Toronto Canadian Sheet Music Collection

1891 births
1965 deaths
Canadian male composers
Academic staff of the Conservatoire de musique du Québec à Montréal
Conservatoire national de musique alumni
Academic staff of the Conservatoire national de musique
Academic staff of McGill University
Musicians from Montreal
Persons of National Historic Significance (Canada)
20th-century Canadian composers
20th-century Canadian male musicians
Canadian military musicians